Hussaini Brahmin  is a Mohyal Brahmin community of the Punjab-region.

The Mohyal community comprises seven sub-clans named Bali, Bhimwal, Chhibber, Datt, Lau, Mohan and Vaid.

However, as consistent with their Hindu tradition, they have adopted non-Indic traditions. This has led to a small sub-set of the Moyhal community paying reverence to Islam, most notably to the third Imam Hussain. Citing source from history of the Mohyals, published in 1911 CE., it is disclosed that about 1,400 Brahmins had been living in Baghdad capital of Iraq when the Battle of Karbala took place in 680 AD.

Few families can still be found in parts of Iraq but most families of Hussaini Brahmins are now settled in Pune, Delhi, Chandigarh, Punjab and Jammu region in India. Sindh, Chakwal and Lahore in Pakistan and Kabul and South Afghanistan in Afghanistan. Some of them also observe Muharram every year.

A sect of Bhumihar Brahmins in the Muzzafarpur district of Bihar also claim ancestry from Hussaini Brahmins and take part in Muharram each year.

Muhiyals have been rulers of territories in the present day Afghanistan, Pakistan and India.

Story of Mohyal Brahmin

As per Mohyal oral history, a Mohyal Brahmin of the Dutt clan had fought on behalf of Imam al-Husayn in the Battle of Karbala (680 C.E.), more specifically in the storming of Kufa—sacrificing his seven sons in the process. According to legend, Rahab Sidh Dutt (also mentioned as Rahib Sidh or Sidh Viyog Datt in some versions) was the leader of a small band of career-soldiers living near Baghdad around the time of the battle of Karbala. The legend mentions the place where he stayed as Dair-al-Hindiya, meaning "The Indian Quarter", which matches an Al-Hindiya in existence today.

Other
In Ajmer, Rajasthan, a place of Sufi pilgrimage, where Moinuddin Chishti lived and passed his last days, there is even today a class of people who call themselves Hussaini Brahmins, who are neither 'orthodox Hindus' nor orthodox Muslims. Hussaini Brahmins practiced a mixed blend of orthodox Vedic and Islamic traditions. A saying in Hindi/Urdu language refers to the Hussaini Brahmans thus: "Wah Datt Sultan, Hindu ka dharm, Musalman ka Iman, Adha Hindu adha Musalman" (Well Datt Sultan, declaring Hindu Dharma and following Muslim practice, Half Hindu and Half Muslim.<ref name="Virag Pachpore">{{cite news
| url = http://en.newsbharati.com/Encyc/2013/8/9/Hussaini-Brahmans-A-historic-bondage-between-Hindus-and-Shias#.VjslXtIrLct
| title = Hussaini Brahmans: A historic bondage between Hindus and Shias
| publisher = News Bharati English
| date = 9 August 2013
| accessdate = 5 November 2015
| archive-url = https://web.archive.org/web/20160304112559/http://en.newsbharati.com/Encyc/2013/8/9/Hussaini-Brahmans-A-historic-bondage-between-Hindus-and-Shias#.VjslXtIrLct
| archive-date = 4 March 2016
| url-status = dead

See also 

 Punjabi Hindus
 Mohyal Brahmins
 Ganga-Jamuni tehzeeb
 Hindu–Islamic relations
 Hindu–Muslim unity
 Religious syncretism

References

Indian castes
Mohyal
Hindu communities
Hinduism in India
Hinduism in Pakistan
Hindu communities of Pakistan
Hinduism and Islam
Secularism in India
Punjabi Brahmins
Brahmin communities
Brahmin communities of India
Brahmin communities across India
Punjabi tribes
Social groups of Punjab, India
Social groups of Jammu and Kashmir
Social groups of India
Social groups of Pakistan
Ethnic groups in India
Cultural anthropology